Phyllodesmium hyalinum is a species of sea slug, an aeolid nudibranch, a marine gastropod mollusc in the family Facelinidae.

Phyllodesmium hyalinum is the type species of the genus Phyllodesmium.

Distribution 
This species was described from the Red Sea. The distribution of Phyllodesmium hyalinum includes Tanzania, Australia, Japan, Philippines and the Marshall islands.

Description 
The length of this sea slug is up to 45 mm. It is a pale pink-blue, mottled species, with loosely spaced cerata. This species contains zooxanthellae.

Ecology 
The habitat of Phyllodesmium hyalinum is among shallow coral reefs with Xenia octocorals. It feeds on Xenia, Xenia umbellata and Heteroxenia fuscescens. This species is more frequently recorded as an incidental to research carried out on its prey species, the alcyonarians Xenia and Heteroxenia. It is camouflaged by the similarity of its cerata to the tentacles of these corals and hides in burrows made in the fleshy base of the Xenia.

References

 Richmond, M. (Ed.) (1997). A guide to the seashores of Eastern Africa and the Western Indian Ocean islands. Sida/Department for Research Cooperation, SAREC: Stockholm, Sweden. . 448 pp

Facelinidae
Gastropods described in 1831
Taxa named by Christian Gottfried Ehrenberg